The bodhrán (plural bodhráin or bodhráns) is a  frame drum used in Irish music ranging from  in diameter, with most drums measuring . A goatskin head is tacked to one side (synthetic heads or other animal skins are sometimes used). The other side is open-ended for one hand to be placed against the inside of the drum head to control the pitch and timbre.

One or two crossbars, sometimes removable, may be inside the frame, but this is increasingly rare on modern instruments. Some professional modern bodhráns integrate mechanical tuning systems similar to those used on drums found in drum kits. It is usually with a hex key that the bodhrán skins are tightened or loosened depending on the atmospheric conditions.

History
Seán Ó Riada declared the bodhrán to be the native drum of the ancient Celts (as did bodhrán maker Paraic McNeela), suggesting that it was possibly used originally for winnowing or wool dying, with a musical history that predated Christianity, native to southwest Ireland.

However, according to musician Ronan Nolan, former editor of Irish Music magazine, the bodhrán evolved in the mid-19th century from the tambourine, which can be heard on some Irish music recordings dating back to the 1920s and viewed in a pre-Famine painting. However, in remote parts of the south-west, the "poor man's tambourine" – made from farm implements and without the cymbals – was in popular use among mummers, or wren boys. A large oil painting on canvas from 1833 by Daniel Maclise (1806–1870) depicts a large Halloween house party in which a tambourine-style bodhrán features clearly. It is in a group of musicians with union pipes, a fiddle, and a fife. The bodhrán is struck with the back of the player's hand, as is sometimes still done, rather than with a cipín, also known in English as a "tipper.” In the early 20th century, home-made frame drums were constructed using willow branches as frames, leather as drumheads, and pennies as jingles. Photographs from the 1940s and videos from the 1950s show bodhráns with jingles played with ’'cipín.

Name
The Irish word  (plural ), indicating a drum, is first mentioned in a translated English document in the 17th century. It appears in Jacob Pool's list of words from the Baronies of Forth and Bargy in county Wexford (collected in the late 18th century), meaning "A drum, tambourine...also a sieve used in winnowing corn".

Third-generation bodhrán maker Caramel Tobin suggests that the name  means "skin tray". He also suggests a link with the Irish word , meaning, among other things, a drum or a dull sound (it also means deaf). A relatively new introduction to Irish music, the bodhrán without jingles has largely supplanted its predecessor.

Possible antecedents
The bodhrán is one of the most basic of drums and as such it is similar to the frame drums distributed widely across northern Africa from the Middle East, and has cognates in instruments used for Arabic music and the musical traditions of the Mediterranean region (see Music of North Africa, Music of Greece etc.).  A larger form is found in the Iranian daf, which is played with the fingers in an upright position, without a stick. Traditional skin drums made by some Native Americans are very close in design to the bodhrán as well.

It has also been suggested that the origin of the instrument may be the skin trays used in Ireland for carrying peat; the earliest bodhrán may have simply been a skin stretched across a wood frame without any means of attachment.  The Cornish frame drum crowdy-crawn, which was also used for harvesting grain, was known as early as 1880. 
 
Peter Kennedy observed a similar instrument in Dorset and Wiltshire in the 1950s, where it was known as a "riddle drum", a riddle being a large sieve for separating soil particles from stones etc.

Dorothea Hast has stated that until the mid-twentieth century the bodhrán was mainly used as a tray for separating chaff, in baking, as a food server, and for storing food or tools. She argues that its use as musical instrument was restricted to ritual use in rural areas. She claims that while the earliest evidence of its use beyond ritual occurs in 1842, its use as a general instrument did not become widespread until the 1960s, when Seán Ó Riada used it.

Popularity
There are no known references to this particular name for a drum prior to the 17th century. Although various drums (played with either hands or sticks) have been used in Ireland since ancient times, the bodhrán itself did not gain wide recognition as a legitimate musical instrument until the Irish traditional music resurgence in the 1960s in which it became known through the music of Seán Ó Riada and others.

The second wave roots revival of Irish Traditional music in the 1960s and 1970s brought virtuoso bodhrán playing to the forefront, when it was further popularized by bands such as Ceoltóirí Chualann and The Chieftains.

Growing interest led to internationally available LP recordings, at which time the bodhrán became a globally recognized instrument. In the 1970s, virtuoso players such as The Boys of the Lough's Robin Morton, The Chieftains' Peadar Mercier, Planxty's Christy Moore, and De Dannan's Johnny "Ringo" McDonagh further developed playing techniques.

 International use 
Although most common in Ireland, the bodhrán has gained popularity throughout the Celtic music world, especially in Scotland, Cape Breton, North mainland Nova Scotia, Newfoundland, and Prince Edward Island. In Southern England tambourines were a popular accompaniment to traditional dance music. In the South West of England a similar instrument made from the frame of a garden sieve was once popular and known as a Riddle Drum. In Cornish traditional music they are called a crowdy-crawn; the use of this instrument to store odds and ends led to the name also being used to mean "miscellaneous".

 Beaters 

Tippers were originally fashioned from a double-ended knuckle bone, but are now commonly made from ash, holly, or hickory wood. Brush-ended beaters, and a "rim shot" (striking the rim) technique for contrast, were introduced by Johnny McDonagh.

 Playing 

The drum is usually played in a seated position, held vertically on the player's thigh and supported by their upper body and arm (usually on the left side, for a right-handed player), with the hand placed on the inside of the skin where it is able to control the tension (and therefore the pitch and timbre) by applying varying amounts of pressure and also the amount of surface area being played, with the back of the hand against the crossbar, if present. The drum is struck with the other arm (usually the right) and is played either with the bare hand or with a tipper. There are numerous playing styles, mostly named after the region of Ireland in which they originated. The most common is Kerry style, which uses a two-headed tipper; the West Limerick style uses only one end of the tipper.

Later players such as Robbie Breathnach, Tommy Hayes, Aidan "Scobie" McDonnell, Abe Doron, and Damien Quinn developed sophisticated pitch-varying techniques which allow players to follow the tune being played. This was the birth of the "top-end" style. Their breakthrough in this style has achieved local and international acclaim, with many beginners now being educated in this manner. This "top-end" style is often played on a smaller (14–15 inch) and deeper (4–6 inch) drum with a thinner resonant skin, prepared like the skin of a Lambeg drum. The tipper in this style is usually straight and most of the expressive action is focused on the top end of the drum.  The concept involves allowing a greater vs. lesser amount of the skin to resonate, with the "skin hand" acting as a moving bearing edge.  Top-end players move the skin hand from the bottom and towards the top of the drum to generate increasingly high pitches.  By making a "C" shape with the skin hand, the player can help enhance and even amplify the sound.  The same concept can be employed while playing at the front of the drum (the skin hand moving towards and away from the player) or in a "bottom end" style, which is essentially top end, but upside down, with the majority of tipper strikes at the bottom of the head.  In any of these styles, crossbars are most often absent, allowing a more unrestricted access for the left hand to modify the tone. This enables a more melodic approach to this rhythm instrument, with a wide range of tones being employed.

When playing the bodhrán as an accompaniment to Irish music, different beats may be used. For example, reels have a 4/4 time. The bodhrán player must stick to this rhythm but is free to improvise within the structure: most simply, they may enunciate the first beat of four, making a sound like ONE two three four ONE two three four; but they can syncopate, put in double pulses, according to the rhythmic characteristics of the tunes being played. This is the difference between sensitive and insensitive playing, a matter of much concern to other traditional musicians. Because the bodhrán typically plays 16th notes (Kerry style), a great deal of variety can be introduced by these syncopations and the use of rests. Combined with manual pitch changes and naturally occurring tonal variations in an animal skin drumhead, the bodhrán can almost sound as melodically expressive as other non-percussive instruments.

 New techniques 
Playing styles have all been affected by the introduction of the internal tone ring, driven against the skin to tension/loosen it by screws. This was invented by Seamus O'Kane, from Dungiven, County Londonderry, Northern Ireland, to combat the damp conditions of Donegal in 1975. This system was copied from banjo design but adapted for bodhráns. For a few years only about six drums of this type were made, so it was not until the idea was taken and refined by makers that it caught on. This system is now being used by makers from many diverse cultures worldwide. It has revolutionized the making and playing of bodhráns by removing the threat of atmospheric conditions to the tension of the drumhead. The accepted philosophy of thick skins was challenged also at this time by O'Kane's introduction of thin Lambeg skins. This allowed the bodhrán to achieve both higher and lower crisp notes and allowed the players to become more musical and delicate in their playing.

 Common modifications 
It is currently not unusual for the rim of a bodhran to be covered with electrical tape, either by the drum-maker or the owner. This both reduces "edge-loading" (where the vibrations in the skin hit the rim and bounce back toward the center of the drum), and dampens unwanted overtones, allowing for greater control of the drum's sound. Electrical tape is preferred because the adhesive is rubber-based and will stretch with the skin even after bonding to it, lessening the likelihood of bubbles and other changes in the tape occurring when the skin tension is changed by tuning or atmospheric conditions. Owners of lower quality drums, with thick and rough skins, may also choose to sand the skin very lightly to reduce the rasp when the tipper strikes the face of the drum. Many effects of these and other modifications to the drum-skin, especially high quality skins, can also be achieved through regular use of the drum over time.

As world music in general has become more popular, techniques once associated with other ethnic drumming traditions have become widespread in bodhrán playing.

The World Bodhrán Championships are held in Milltown, County Kerry, Ireland each year.

See also

List of bodhrán players
Tar (drum)
Frame drum

 References 

 Nicholas Driver "The Bodhran", English Dance and Sing'' 40/1 1978 p15
  (interview with Johnny McDonagh)

External links

 
 

Directly struck membranophones
Hand drums
Hand percussion
Unpitched percussion instruments
Percussion instruments played with specialised beaters
Scottish musical instruments
Irish musical instruments
Celtic musical instruments
European percussion instruments